Christopher A. Chaney (born June 14, 1970) is an American musician. He is best known as the former bassist of alternative rock band Jane's Addiction, and as a member of Alanis Morissette's touring and recording band for six years. Chaney was also a member of Taylor Hawkins and the Coattail Riders and Camp Freddy. A prolific and versatile session musician, he has played with a variety of recording artists ranging from Joe Satriani, Joe Cocker, Shakira, Slash, Beth Hart, Adam Lambert, Alanis Morissette, Avril Lavigne, Bryan Adams, Sara Bareilles, Gavin Degraw, Cher, John Fogerty, Lisa Marie Presley, Meat Loaf, Rob Zombie, Romeo Santos, James Blunt, Shinedown, and Celine Dion.

Biography
Chaney was raised in Mill Valley, California. He attended Berklee College of Music, and then moved to Los Angeles in 1991 to pursue music and played at the L.A. jazz club the Baked Potato and the Dragonfly in Hollywood. Chaney was first invited to tour with Alanis Morissette in 1995 on the Jagged Little Pill Tour and continued to work with Morissette until 2001, appearing on three studio albums and two live albums.

While working with Morissette, Chaney developed a reputation as a versatile professional bassist. He has since recorded and/or toured with a wide variety of artists. His next high-profile job was as the full-time replacement for Eric Avery in the 2002 reunion of Jane's Addiction, contributing to the album Strays. He then formed the band The Panic Channel with Jane's Addiction members Dave Navarro and Stephen Perkins; the group released the album (ONe) in 2006. In 2006, he joined the band Taylor Hawkins and the Coattail Riders, formed by Taylor Hawkins of the Foo Fighters. Chaney and Hawkins had previously worked together in Morissette's band. The group released the albums Taylor Hawkins and the Coattail Riders in 2006 and Red Light Fever in 2010. Chaney is also bassist for all-star cover band Camp Freddy.

Chaney has played with several recording artists and over 25 film scores and soundtracks. Artists include: Celine Dion, Eddie Vedder, Ozzy Osbourne, Michelle Branch, Ben Taylor, Eric Hutchinson,  Carly Simon, Rob Zombie, Joe Satriani, Andrew W.K., Tommy Lee's Methods of Mayhem, and Will Hoge. He joined Johnny Rzeznik of The Goo Goo Dolls for the song "I'm Still Here" from soundtrack to the animated movie Treasure Planet. He is also featured on the 2007 album Little Voice by Sara Bareilles, and the 2008 album The Sound of Madness by Shinedown (replacing departed bassist Brad Stewart). Chaney has worked with James Stephen Hart on his project Burn Halo. 
Chaney is featured as the primary bassist on guitarist Slash's 2010 solo album, Slash. In March 2010, Slash described Chaney as a "godsend", stating: "Chris is just the best session player that I know so I called him up. I didn’t want to use Duff McKagan so I was tryin’ to think of bass players and Chris I’ve worked with so many times and he's easy going, and he learns quickly."
In 2022, Chaney played bass on Beth Hart’s “A Tribute to Led Zeppelin” album and will join Eddie Vedder´s band in the Earthlings tour.

He is married to voice actress Tifanie Christun, daughter of Cheryl Saban and the stepdaughter of Haim Saban.

Influences
Chaney's influences include Geddy Lee, John Paul Jones of Led Zeppelin, Paul McCartney, James Jamerson, Jaco Pastorius, Marcus Miller, and Stevie Wonder.

Gear
Chaney is endorsed exclusively with Fender.  He also has endorsements with Aguilar Amps, Dunlop, and Audimute. As of the June 2003 issue of Bass Player magazine, Chaney's gear listing for recording and touring is as follows:

Basses
’62 and ’66 Fender Jazz Basses
’58, ’59, and ’60 Fender Precision Basses
Fender Custom Shop Jazz Bass with pearl-inlays and Basslines pickups
Two Lakland Bob Glaub models
Lakland hollowbody four-string
Lakland Joe Osborn five-string
Four Sadowsky Jazz Basses (two four-string and two five-string models)
Guild M85
Guild Starfire
Höfner hollowbody (strung with flatwound strings)
Gibson EB-2
Gibson Ripper
Epiphone Jack Casady model and El Capitan acoustic bass guitars
Rob Allen fretless four-string semi-acoustic bass with Basslines pickups and La Bella tapewound strings
Meisel plywood upright with Helicore strings.
 D'Addario strings

Amplifiers and speaker cabinets
Aguilar DB 900 DI
Aguilar DB 680 preamp
Avalon U5 DI/preamp
Ashdown ABM500 2x10" combo amplifier
Two Aguilar DB 750 heads (large venues)
Two Aguilar GS 412 4x12" speaker cabinets (large venues)

Rackmounted gear and effects
Furman Power Conditioner
Korg DTR-1 tuner
Line 6 Echo Pro
Line 6 Mod Pro
Empirical Labs Distressor compressor
Line 6 Bass Pod Pro
Digital Music Corp. GCX switcher
Digital Music Corp. Ground Control Pro
Big Briar Moogerfooger
Roland Jet Phaser
Musictronics Mu-tron III envelope filter
Prescription Electronic Depth Charge overdrive
Z. Vex Wooly Mammoth overdrive
DigiTech Synth Wah
Budda Phatbass tube overdrive
MXR M-80 DI Overdrive
Big Muff
EBS OctaBass
Boss OC-2 Octave
MXR M-88 octaver
Pefftronics Rand-O-Matic
Electro-Harmonix Q-Tron
DigiTech Bass Whammy
Carl Martin compressor
Carl Martin stereo chorus

Discography

 2020 I'm Nothing, Damián Gaume, Bass
2020 Shapeshifting, Joe Satriani, bass and rhythm guitar (one track)
2019 Ex Nihilo, Figure 8, Bass
2014 Anticipated Releases: LP, Bryan Adams
2013 All That Echoes, Josh Groban, Bass  
2013 Classic Album Collection, Rob Zombie, Bass  
2013 Closer to the Truth, Cher, Bass  
2013 Heartthrob, Tegan and Sara, Bass  
2013 Unstoppable Momentum, Joe Satriani, Bass  
2013 Live in NYC, Jane's Addiction, Composer and bass 
2012 Fire It Up, Joe Cocker, Bass  
2012 Into the Wild: Live at EastWest Studios, LP, Bass  
2011 Formula, Vol. 1, Romeo Santos, Bass  
2011 Ghost on the Canvas, Glen Campbell, Bass  
2011 People and Things, Jack's Mannequin, Bass  
2011 Sweeter, Gavin DeGraw, Bass  
2011 The Great Escape Artist, Jane's Addiction, Bass  
2011 This Loud Morning, David Cook, Bass  
2010 A Public Disservice Announcement, Methods of Mayhem, Bass  
2010 Hang Cool Teddy Bear, Meat Loaf, Bass  
2010 Hard Knocks, Joe Cocker, Bass  
2010 Red Light Fever, Taylor Hawkins and the Coattail Riders, Bass  
2010 Slash, Slash, Bass  
2010 Some Kind of Trouble, James Blunt, Bass  
2010 The Band Perry, The Band Perry, Bass  
2010 The Other Side of Down, David Archuleta, Bass  
2009 Believe, Orianthi, Bass  
2009 For Your Entertainment, Adam Lambert, Bass  
2009 The Blue Ridge Rangers Rides Again, John Fogerty, Bass  
2009 The Boy Who Never, Landon Pigg, Bass  
2008 Break the Silence, Jon Peter Lewis, Bass  
2008 Gavin DeGraw, Gavin DeGraw, Bass  
2008 Meet Glen Campbell, Glen Campbell, Bass  
2008 My Love: Essential Collection, Celine Dion, Bass  
2008 The Sound of Madness, Shinedown, Bass  
2007 This Moment, Steven Curtis Chapman, Bass on tracks 2, 3, 4, 7, 10 & 11
2007 Angels & Devils, Fuel, Bass   
2007 Little Voice, Sara Bareilles, Bass  
2007 The Best Damn Thing, Avril Lavigne, Bass  
2006 (ONe), The Panic Channel, Bass  
2006 Daughtry, Daughtry, Bass on "What About Now"
2006 Every Man for Himself, Hoobastank, Bass on tracks 3, 5, 9, 10
2006 Now & Then, Steven Curtis Chapman, Bass  
2006 Taylor Hawkins and the Coattail Riders, Taylor Hawkins and the Coattail Riders, Bass
2006 Time Without Consequence, Alexi Murdoch, Bass  
2006 Up from the Catacombs – The Best of Jane's Addiction, Jane's Addiction, Bass tracks 7 & 9
2005 Oral Fixation, Vol. 2, Shakira, Bass
2005 Oral Fixation, Vol. 1, Shakira, Bass
2005 Now What,  Lisa Marie Presley, Bass  
2004 All Things New, Steven Curtis Chapman, Bass on tracks 1-11
2004 E.P. #1, Ben Taylor, Composer  
2004 Electro Addiction: An Electro Tribute to Jane's Addiction, Composer  
2004 Pictures from Home, John Gregory, Bass  
2003 Hotel Paper, Michelle Branch, Bass  
2003 One Heart, Celine Dion, Bass  
2003 Strays, Jane's Addiction, Bass 
2002 Christmas Is Almost Here, Carly Simon, Bass  
2002 Feast on Scraps, Alanis Morissette, Bass  
2002 Never a Dull Moment, Tommy Lee, Bass
2002 Under Rug Swept, Alanis Morissette, Bass  
2001 I Get Wet, Andrew W.K., Bass
2001 The Sinister Urge, Rob Zombie, Bass  
2000 Love Life, Warren Hill, Bass  
1999 Alanis Unplugged, Alanis Morissette, Bass  
1999 Methods of Mayhem, Methods of Mayhem, Bass  
1998 Supposed Former Infatuation Junkie, Alanis Morissette, Bass  
1997 Tibetan Freedom Concert, Bass on disc 2 track 11

Film scores and soundtrack credits
1998 City of Angels [Original Soundtrack]   Bass
1998 Waterboy Bass
1999 Dogma [Original Soundtrack]  Howard Shore Bass (Electric)
1999 The Other Sister Bass
2013 The Hangover Trilogy,  Hollywood Studio Symphony, Bass
2013 Identity Theft, Bass
2012 Men in Black 3, Danny Elfman, Bass  
2012 The Campaign, Bass
2011 Arthur, Bass
2011 Sucker Punch, Bass  
2011 Real Steel, Bass
2011 Horrible Bosses, Bass
2010 Burlesque, Bass  
2010 Date Night, Bass
2010 Due Date, Bass
2010 Red, Bass
2010 Dinner for Schmucks, Theodore Shapiro, Bass  
2010 Get Him to the Greek, Infant Sorrow, Bass  
2009 2012, Thomas Wander, Bass  
2009 A Very Special Christmas 7, Bass  
2009 Watchmen [Original Motion Picture Score]  Tyler Bates Bass (Electric)
2007 300 [Original Motion Picture Soundtrack] [The Collector's Edition]  Tyler Bates Bass (Electric)
2007 Treasure Planet [Original Motion Picture Score]  James Newton Howard Bass  
2006 Employee of the Month Bass
2005 40 Year Old Virgin Bass
2003 Now DVD Composer  
2003 Wicked: A New Musical [Original Broadway Cast Recording]   Bass

References

External links
Bass Player Magazine: "Not Another Dream Gig!"
Bass Player Magazine "Chris Chaney's Pop Bass Potpourri (Electric Bass lesson)

1970 births
American male guitarists
21st-century American bass guitarists
Living people
People from Mill Valley, California
American rock bass guitarists
American male bass guitarists
Alternative metal bass guitarists
Berklee College of Music alumni
Jane's Addiction members
Tamalpais High School alumni
Methods of Mayhem members
Taylor Hawkins and the Coattail Riders members
Camp Freddy members
The Panic Channel members